Adesuwa Obasuyi (born February 1990, Nigeria) is a Nigerian environmentalist and climate change advocate and the initiator of Sustainable Africa Cities and Communities Initiative, an environmental non-governmental organization that focuses on waste and waste data management in Nigeria and Africa. and she currently works as the Climate Change Policy Manager at the British High Commission, Abuja.

Early and personal life

She attended Delta State University and obtained a bachelor's degree in Biochemistry in 2010; she went further to get a master's degree in Environmental Quality Management (2014 - 2017) from the University of Benin.

Career

Early in her career, she worked as a research assistant while advocating for the environment and climate change. She later became an Operations Manager at Sustainable Africa Waste Initiative (SAWI). She further went on to become an ambassador for TeachSDGS. She is also an ambassador for the Global Youth Climate Network. Currently, she works at British High Commission, Abuja as a climate change policy manager. She has several experiences in volunteering. She has volunteered with the Nigerian youth SDGs network as a member and mentor, pick that trash and NYSC/NDLEA drug-free club at Bayelsa.

References

University of Benin (Nigeria) alumni
1990 births
Living people
Nigerian environmentalists